Chiloneus is a genus of weevils in the tribe Sciaphilini.

References 

 Borovec, R. & Perrin, H. 2016. On the systematic position of some species of Chiloneus, Desbrochersella and Sciaphilus, with description of two new species and lectotype selection (Coleoptera: Curculionidae: Entiminae). Zootaxa 4109(2), pages 131–152,

External links 

 
 
 Chiloneus at insectoid.info

Entiminae
Curculionidae genera